Pat McGrath (born 1961) is an Irish retired hurler and Gaelic footballer. His league and championship career with the Tipperary senior teams in both codes spanned nine seasons from 1981 to 1989. 

Born in Loughmore, County Tipperary, McGrath was raised in a family that had a strong affinity for Gaelic games. His father, Mick McGrath, and his uncles, enjoyed county championship success with the Loughmore–Castleiney club in the 1950s.

McGrath attended Rockwell College while simultaneously coming to prominence at juvenile and underage levels with the Loughmore–Casteiney teams. As a dual player at senior level, he won a total of five county championship medals.

McGrath made his debut on the inter-county scene at the age of sixteen when he was selected for both Tipperary minor teams. He enjoyed three championship seasons as a dual player with the minor teams before subsequently joining the under-21 teams with whom he won back-to-back All-Ireland medals in 1980 and 1981. By this stage Ryan had also joined the Tipperary senior hurling team, before later joining the Tipperary senior football team. McGrath won his sole All-Ireland medal in 1989, having earlier collected a Munster medal.

McGrath's sons, Noel and John, are also All-Ireland medal winners with Tipperary.

Honours

Loughmore–Castleiney
Tipperary Senior Hurling Championship (1): 1988
Tipperary Senior Football Championship (4): 1979, 1983, 1987, 1992

Tipperary
All-Ireland Senior Hurling Championship (1): 1989
Munster Senior Hurling Championship (1): 1989
All-Ireland Under-21 Hurling Championship (2): 1980, 1981
Munster Under-21 Hurling Championship (2): 1980, 1981

References

1961 births
Living people
Loughmore-Castleiney hurlers
Loughmore-Castleiney Gaelic footballers
Tipperary inter-county hurlers
Tipperary inter-county Gaelic footballers
Hurling selectors
People educated at Rockwell College